This is a list of the Hun kings from the arrival of the Huns in Europe in the 360s/370s until the fall of the Hunnic Empire in 469 AD.

The following list starts with Balamber, the first known king of the Huns, who is thought to be one of the earliest, if not the first, Hun king since their arrival in Pannonia. Jordanes recounts in his Getica that Balamber crushed the Ostrogoths in the 370s, probably some time between 370 and 376. The existence of Balamber, however, is disputed by some historians, thus making Uldin the first undisputed king of the Huns.

The Huns are thought to have had a sole king and several "sub-kings", or to have ruled in a dual-monarchy, similarly to their predecessors, the Xiongnu. Some historians think that the Huns divided their empire in halves, with one king ruling the eastern part of the empire and another king ruling the western part (e.g. Attila and Bleda).

Attila is the last ascertained sole ruler of the Huns, a position he apparently assumed after murdering his brother Bleda. Attila appointed his eldest son, Ellac, as King of Pontic Scythia as well as bestowing on him the additional title of King of the Akatziri. Attila also displayed a particular fondness for his younger son, Ernak, for whom the king's shamans had prophesied an important role in continuing his line. Attila, however, died unexpectedly in 453, before naming a heir, and his many sons fought among themselves for the empire, tearing it apart. Ellac died shortly after his father, at the decisive Battle of Nedao. Dengizich, another son of Attila, perished in 469. Attila's young son, Ernak, managed to maintain peaceful relations with the Romans living in the Dobruja region. 

According to Hungarian legend, one of the numerous children of Attila was named Csaba. He is described as a skilled warrior and general in Hungarian chronicles who led his people to many victories. In the Hungarian chronicles, he is regarded as the ancestor of the Aba clan. According to Hungarian chronicles and tradition, also Árpád was a descendant of Attila, though it is unclear whether he descended from him through Csaba or another of his children. Hungarian chronicles also claim that the Magyars and the Huns descend from two brothers, Hunor and Magor, and their respective wives, the daughters of Dula, or Dulo. Attila's younger son, Ernak is a namesake of a member of the so-called Dulo clan, the first ruler of the Bulgars according to the Nominalia of the Bulgarian khans, living in the days of Attila. The person mentioned in the Nominalia is considered to be Ernak himself, or at least of Attilid descent.

See also
History of the Huns
List of Huns

Notes

References

 
Hunnic